The President Hotel is a hotel in the center of Pechersk, Kyiv, Ukraine. It was initially built as part of the All-Union hotel chain Intourist. Today, the hotel belongs to hotel chain Vertex Hotel Group.

Restaurant
The hotel has its own restaurant, à la carte "Slavyansky", that serves Ukrainian and Mediterranean cuisine.

See also 

 List of hotels in Ukraine

References

External links
 Information at the State Management of Affairs website

Tourist attractions in Kyiv
Hotels in Kyiv
Buildings and structures completed in 1990
Hotels built in the Soviet Union
Hotels established in 1990
Pecherskyi District